The Suzuki V-Strom 250, also known as the DL250 (AL and AM), is a dual-sport motorcycle  with a 248 cc Straight-twin engine and a standard riding posture. It has been manufactured in China by Suzuki since 2017, as an entry in the lighter adventure motorcycle in the line of the Suzuki V-Strom 650, Suzuki V-Strom 1000 and the Suzuki V-Strom 1050. The DL250 is implemented to compete with the BMW G310R and the 250/300 cc Kawasaki Versys. The DL250 was unveiled in 2017 by Suzuki and was originally intended for the Asian market.

The name V-Strom is chosen to keep the DL250 in line with the other V-Strom models and combines "V" referring to the larger V-Stroms engine configuration with the German Strom, meaning stream or power. Even though the DL250 does not contain a V-twin engine, but a parallel 2-cylinder engine.

The DL250 motorcycle is based on the straight-twin 2-cylinder engine initially designed for the GW250/Inazuma 250 and GSX250R. From its release in 2017 until 2020 the bike was available in the European, Australian and Asian market. As of 2021, the V-Strom 250 is no longer available in markets other than the Asian market.

Features 

The Suzuki V-Strom 250's design is in resemblance of the larger V-strom bikes, including the beak-like front fairing. With the discontinuation of the non-abs the bike is standard equipped with ABS. The bike is also equipped with an aluminium under cowl. The instruments are displayed on a new full LCD dashboard, which also contains a 12V DC-charger.

Optional equipment

Because the Suzuki V-Strom is aimed towards a commuter, daily usage and light adventure market, there are several options a user can choose. The options include aluminium panniers, centre stand, hand guards and mirror extension kits.

References

External links

V-Strom 250
Dual-sport motorcycles
Suzuki